Małkinia Górna  is a large village in Ostrów Mazowiecka County, Masovian Voivodeship, Poland, with about 6,000 inhabitants (2005). It is the seat of the administrative district called Gmina Małkinia Górna.

Małkinia is a railway junction. There, the main line between Warsaw and Białystok crosses with the less important line between Ostrołęka and Siedlce. During World War II the Treblinka extermination camp was located nearby. Prisoners were often held in locked trains at the Małkinia railway station awaiting transport into the camp.

References

 Jewish Community in Małkinia Górna on Virtual Shtetl

Villages in Ostrów Mazowiecka County
Holocaust locations in Poland